Axtell High School is a public high school located in Axtell, Texas and classified as a 2A school by the UIL.  It is part of the Axtell Independent School District which covers northeastern McLennan County.   In 2015, the school was rated "Met Standard" by the Texas Education Agency.

Athletics
The Axtell Longhorns compete in these sports - 
 
Volleyball, Cross Country, Football, Powerlifting, Basketball, Golf, Tennis, Track, Softball, and Baseball.

Notable alumni
Van Hughes, professional football player
John H. Miller, Marine Corps Lieutenant general

References

External links
Axtell ISD website

Public high schools in Texas
Schools in McLennan County, Texas